Intergroups are formed of Members of the European Parliament from any political group and any committee, with a view to holding informal exchanges of views on particular subjects and promoting contact between Members and civil society.

Intergroups are not Parliament bodies and may not express Parliament’s opinion.

Intergroups are subject to internal rules adopted by the Conference of Presidents on 16 December 1999 (last updated on 14 February 2008), which set out the conditions under which intergroups may be established at the beginning of each parliamentary term and their operating rules.

Chairs of intergroups are required to declare any support they receive in cash or kind, according to the same criteria applicable to Members as individuals. The declarations must be updated every year and are filed in a public register held by the Quaestors.

List of Intergroups (2019—2024) 

 Anti-corruption
 Anti-racism and diversity
 Artificial Intelligence and Digital
 Biodiversity, hunting, countryside
 Cancer
 Children’s rights
 Christians in the Middle East
 Climate change, biodiversity and sustainable development
 Sustainable, Long-term investments & Competitive European Industry
 Demographic challenges, family-work balance and youth transition
 Disability
 European cultural heritage, Ways of Saint-James and other European cultural routes
 Fighting against poverty
 Freedom of religion and religious tolerance
 Green New deal
 LGBTI
 Rural, Mountainous and remote areas (RUMRA) and smart villages
 SEARICA
 Sky and Space
 SME
 Social economy
 Trade Unions
 Traditional minorities, national communities and languages
 Urban
 Welfare and conservation of animals
 Western Sahara
 Wine, spirit and foodstuffs

List of Intergroups (2014—2019)

Active ageing, intergenerational solidarity & family policies 
Anti-racism and diversity 
Biodiversity, countryside, hunting and recreational fisheries 
Children's rights Members
Climate change, sustainable development and biodiversity 
Common goods and public services 
Creative industries 
Digital agenda 
Disability 
Extreme poverty and human rights 
European tourism development, cultural heritage, Way of St. James and other European cultural routes 
Freedom of religion or belief and religious tolerance 
Integrity – Transparency, anti- corruption and organised crime Members
Lesbian, Gay, Bisexual, Transgender and Intersex rights – LGBTI  Members
Long-term investment and reindustrialisation
Rural, mountainous and remote areas 
Seas, rivers, islands and coastal areas 
SMEs – Small and medium-sized enterprises Members
Sky and Space 
Social economy 
Sports 
Trade Unions 
Traditional minorities, National communities and Languages 
Urban 
Welfare and conservation of animals 
Western Sahara 
Wine, spirits and quality foodstuffs 
Youth

List of Intergroups (2009—2014)

Sustainable Hunting, Biodiversity, Countryside Activities and Forests 
Ways of Saint James / Caminos de Santiago 28/01/2010 
Media 
Urban 
Public Services (SGI – SSGI) 
Trade Union 
Western Sahara 
Tibet 
Disability 
Water/Wasser 
Traditional National Minorities, Constitutional Regions and Regional Languages 
Mountains, Islands and Sparsely-Populated Regions 
Baltic-Europe 
Lesbian, Gay, Bisexual & Transgender Rights – LGBT
Social Economy / Economie Sociale  
Mers et Zones Côtières / Seas and Coastal Areas 
Sky and Space / Ciel et Espace   
Anti-racisme & Diversity 
Youth Issues / Jeunesse 
Family and the Right of the Child & Bioethics 
Viticulture, Fruits et Legumes, Tradition et Alimentation de qualite 
Welfare & conservation of animals 
SME "small and medium-sized enterprise" 
Ageing and intergenerational solidarity 
Climate change, biodiversity and sustainable development / Changement climatique, biodiversité et développement durable (European Bureau for Conservation and Development) (EBCD/IUCN)
Extreme poverty and human rights
New media

List of intergroups in the EP of 2004—2009 (as at 2005)
Fieldsports, fishing and conservation, 
Welfare & conservation of animals
Family and the Right of the Child
Baltic-Europe
Federalist Intergroup for the European Constitution
Traditional National Minorities, Constitutional Regions and Regional Languages
Cinema, audiovisual policy and cultural diversity
Fourth world European committee
Conservation and sustainable development in the European Parliament
Tourism
Disability
Trade union coordination group
Anti-racisme & Diversity
SME "small and medium-sized enterprise"
Lesbian and gay intergroup
Press, communication and freedom
Tibet
Ciel et espace
Globalisation intergroup
Viticulture-tradition-qualite
Health and consumer
Urban-logement
Ageing
Peace initiatives

Further reading

References

External links
Intergroups at the European Parliament website
Rules governing the establishment of Intergroups